Prinshof is an area in Pretoria.  It is the home of the Faculty of Health Sciences of the University of Pretoria and the Steve Biko Hospital (formerly the Pretoria Academic Hospital).

Prinshof is also the name of a school in Pretoria for partially sighted children.

References

University of Pretoria campus
Suburbs of Pretoria